= YourOneLife =

YourOneLife (YOL) is an application made in India and used by All India Council Of Technical Education's(AICTE) for measuring personal and institutional happiness in educational institutions. Around 50 lakh students and 12,000 higher educational institutions benefit from it. It is created by blockchain network company 5ire and is claimed to be the biggest happiness blockchain with a potential for recording, issuing and verifying more than 8 million students’ academic credentials.

== Objective ==
YourOneLife helps in reflecting personal and institutional happiness guiding students. It claims to be the largest blockchain-based academic accreditation system, based on its potential to support more than 8 million students, who can use it for recording, issuing and verifying academic credentials.

== Features ==
Features:

- Institutional and Individual Happiness Index assessment
- Individual and institution mindshare assessment
- Individual and institutional mind mapping
